The Nestucca River flows for about  through forests near the Pacific coast of northwest Oregon in the United States. It drains a timber-producing area of the Northern Oregon Coast Range west of Portland.

Rising in the mountains of western Yamhill County, it is impounded near its headwaters to create McGuire Reservoir, the primary water source for the city of McMinnville.  The river flows generally west through Bureau of Land Management (BLM) land and the Siuslaw National Forest, past Beaver, then southwest past Hebo and Cloverdale. It enters Nestucca Bay, on the Pacific Ocean, from the north at Pacific City.  The Little Nestucca River does not join the Nestucca but enters Nestucca Bay from the south.

Recreation
Madelynne Sheehan in Fishing in Oregon calls the Nestucca River "a real gem of an all-around stream." Anglers can fish for spring chinook salmon, fall chinook, coho salmon, coastal cutthroat trout, and steelhead. Winter steelhead on this river average , while summer steelhead of  can sometimes appear "almost nose to tail throughout a  section of the river".

Cloverdale, Farmer Creek, Three Rivers, and Pacific City have public boat ramps, and there are less formal put-in places upriver. Upstream of Moon Creek, more than half of the land along the river is publicly owned, is managed by the Siuslaw National Forest and the BLM, and includes five campgrounds. The upper river between Moon Creek and Elk Creek is fished mainly for winter steelhead, and no fishing is allowed upstream of Elk Creek.

The first  of the run include a class 4 rapid followed by a class 5 and another class 4. An alternate put-in is available at a log bridge downstream of the second class 4. Below the bridge, class 2 and 3 whitewater continues for the remaining  of the run.

References

See also 
 List of rivers of Oregon
 List of longest streams of Oregon

Rivers of Oregon
Rivers of Tillamook County, Oregon
Wild and Scenic Rivers of the United States
Oregon placenames of Native American origin